The 2016 Wilmington Hammerheads FC season is the club's 20th year of existence. They are members of the United Soccer League Eastern Conference.

Roster
As of March 28, 2016

Competitions

USL Regular season

Standings

Matches
All times in regular season on Eastern Daylight Time (UTC-04:00)

Schedule source

U.S. Open Cup

References

2016 USL season
American soccer clubs 2016 season
2016 in sports in North Carolina
Wilmington Hammerheads FC seasons